Yeşilyurt is a district (semt in Turkish) in Karabağlar county, Izmir, Turkey. Important streets of Yeşilyurt are Ordu Street (cadde in Turkish), Polat Street, and Mizrakli Street.

District architecture

There are mostly apartment buildings, houses, shops, and shopping centers.  There are many playgrounds scattered throughout the city, though any historical buildings are difficult to find.

Transport

Bus

Transport by bus is controlled by Metropolitan Municipality of Izmir. There are buses that run frequently. There are  4 routes from Yeşilyurt to city center:
662 Yeşilyurt-Cengizhan(15-30 min frequent)
79 Yeşilyurt Devlet Hastanesi-Halkapınar metro(2min-1hour frequent)
18 Yeşilyurt-Konak(10-15min frequent)
699 Yesilyurt-M.Erener(25-35min frequent)

Minibus

Transport by minibus is belong to the Chamber of Drivers. There are routes to Buca, Gaziemir, Otogar-Bornova, Eşrefpaşa.

.

Karabağlar District